The 1976–77 season was Paris Saint-Germain's 7th season in existence. PSG mainly played their home league games at the Parc des Princes in Paris, but once at the Stade Bauer in Saint-Ouen-sur-Seine as well, registering an average attendance of 22,700 spectators per match. The club was presided by Daniel Hechter. The team was managed by Velibor Vasović until May 1977, when Ilija Pantelić replaced him as manager. Mustapha Dahleb was the team captain.

Summary

A new chapter began in 1976–77; club's talisman Jean-Pierre Dogliani retired, while former Serbian player Velibor Vasović replaced Just Fontaine. The first foreigner to sit on the PSG bench, Vasović arrived to the French capital with the goal of playing European football next season. But, even with Mustapha Dahleb's exceptional goalscoring form (26 goals), the Parisians finished in 9th place following a disastrous start to the campaign. Having failed to qualify for Europe, Vasović resigned near the end of the season. Daniel Hechter named former PSG goalkeeper Ilija Pantelić as manager for the last four league matches, registering two wins and two draws.

Players 

As of the 1976–77 season.

Squad

Transfers 

As of the 1976–77 season.

Arrivals

Departures

Kits 

French radio RTL was the shirt sponsor. French sportswear brand Le Coq Sportif was the kit manufacturer.

Friendly tournaments

Tournoi de Paris

Competitions

Overview

Division 1

League table

Results by round

Matches

Coupe de France

Round of 64

Round of 32

Round of 16

Statistics 

As of the 1976–77 season.

Appearances and goals 

|-
!colspan="16" style="background:#dcdcdc; text-align:center"|Goalkeepers

|-
!colspan="16" style="background:#dcdcdc; text-align:center"|Defenders

|-
!colspan="16" style="background:#dcdcdc; text-align:center"|Midfielders

|-
!colspan="16" style="background:#dcdcdc; text-align:center"|Forwards

|-

References

External links 

Official websites
 PSG.FR - Site officiel du Paris Saint-Germain
 Paris Saint-Germain - Ligue 1 
 Paris Saint-Germain - UEFA.com

Paris Saint-Germain F.C. seasons
Association football clubs 1976–77 season
French football clubs 1976–77 season